Putnam County is a county located in the U.S. state of Indiana. As of the 2010 United States Census, the population was 37,963. The county seat is Greencastle. The county was named for Israel Putnam, a hero in the French and Indian War and a general in the American Revolutionary War. The county was created in 1821 and organized in April 1822.

Putnam County is included in the Indianapolis-Carmel-Anderson, IN Metropolitan Statistical Area.

History
After the American Revolutionary War established US sovereignty over the territory of the upper Midwest, the new federal government defined the Northwest Territory in 1787 which included the area of present-day Indiana. In 1800, Congress separated Ohio from the Northwest Territory, designating the rest of the land as the Indiana Territory. President Thomas Jefferson chose William Henry Harrison as the governor of the territory, and Vincennes was established as the future capital. After the Michigan Territory was separated and the Illinois Territory was formed, Indiana was reduced to its current size and geography. In late 1816, the Indiana Territory was admitted to the Union as a state, although much of its territory was still in dispute as to possession by Native Americans. The land containing Putnam County was brought into the possession and control of the United States by the Treaty of St. Mary's in 1818 (known as the New Purchase).

The first county to be organized (1790) in the Northwest Territory was Knox, covering the western part of the future state, with its territory gradually reduced as pockets of settlement allowed the creation of smaller counties. After the Indiana Territory was admitted to the Union as a state on December 11, 1816, Sullivan (December 30, 1816), Vigo (January 21, 1818), and Daviess (February 2, 1818) counties were created, followed by Owen County on December 21, 1818. By 1821, the northern parts of Owen and Vigo counties were sufficiently settled to allow creation of a new county, which was authorized on December 21, 1821, by an act of the Indiana General Assembly. The act tasked five commissioners to meet in May 1822 at the home of James Athey, a log cabin located at the forks of the Eel River. The act also authorized a circuit court to meet at Athey's cabin, which was likely the first such log structure in the county (having been built by the fall of 1818 on a small section of the southwest corner of what became Putnam County, located just south of land encompassed by the 1818 Treaty of St. Mary's). Records show the court met in session at Athey's cabin in June 1822 and again that September, but the assigned commissioners failed to accomplish their task of selecting a county seat. In January 1823, a second group of commissioners was assigned by the legislature to select the county seat by that April, which they accomplished with the designation of Greencastle, located at the geographic center of the county. An incentive was 70 acres of ground donated for the county seat at Greencastle by Ephraim and Rebecca Dukes, who conveyed the corresponding deed in September 1823.

The county's boundary was changed on February 12, 1825, when Clay County was created. It has retained its present configuration since that time.

Geography
The terrain of northern Putnam County is mostly flat; rolling hills become more evident in the center and southwest portions. At the time of settlement, the county was completely tree-covered (poplar, oak, walnut, maple, beech, and hickory), but presently the flat portions have been cleared and used for agriculture; the drainage areas are still wooded. Walnut Creek drains the east central part of the county, flowing south-southwestward into Owen County. Big Walnut Creek drains the upper part of the county, flowing southwestward into Parke County, where it is captured in the Cecil M. Harden Lake. The highest point in the county ( ASL) is a gradual rise  SW of Bainbridge.

Limestone deposits were extracted beginning in the nineteenth century, and a large iron-ore vein southwest of Cloverdale was discovered in the 1860s.

Adjacent counties

 Montgomery County - north
 Hendricks County - east
 Morgan County - southeast
 Owen County - south
 Clay County - southwest
 Parke County - west

Lakes
 Cagles Mill Lake (part)
 Glenn Flint Lake
 Heritage Lake

Protected areas
 DePauw University Nature Park
 Fern Cliff Nature Preserve
 Lieber State Recreation Area

Cities
 Greencastle (county seat)

Towns

 Bainbridge
 Cloverdale
 Fillmore
 Roachdale
 Russellville

Census-designated places
 Heritage Lake
 Van Bibber Lake

Unincorporated places

 Barnard
 Belle Union
 Blakesburg
 Brick Chapel
 Broad Park
 Brunerstown
 Cagle Mill
 Carpentersville
 Cary
 Clinton Falls
 Cradick Corner
 Edgewood Lake
 Fincastle
 Fox Ridge
 Groveland
 Hirt Corner
 Jenkinsville
 Keytsville
 Limedale
 Manhattan
 Morton
 Mount Meridian
 New Maysville
 Pleasant Gardens
 Portland Mills
 Putnamville
 Raab Crossroads
 Raccoon
 Reelsville
 Vivalia
 Westland

Townships

 Clinton
 Cloverdale
 Floyd
 Franklin
 Greencastle
 Jackson
 Jefferson
 Madison
 Marion
 Monroe
 Russell
 Warren
 Washington

Major highways

  Interstate 70
  U.S. Route 36
  U.S. Route 40
  U.S. Route 231
  Indiana State Road 42
  Indiana State Road 75
  Indiana State Road 236
  Indiana State Road 240
  Indiana State Road 243

Climate and weather

Government

The county government is a constitutional body, and is granted specific powers by the Constitution of Indiana, and by the Indiana Code.

County Council: The legislative branch of the county government; controls spending and revenue collection in the county. Representatives are elected to four-year terms from county districts. They set salaries, the annual budget, and special spending. The council has limited authority to impose local taxes, in the form of an income and property tax that is subject to state level approval, excise taxes, and service taxes.

Board of Commissioners: The executive body of the county; commissioners are elected county-wide to staggered four-year terms. One commissioner serves as president. The commissioners execute acts legislated by the council, collect revenue, and manage the county government.

Court:

County Officials: The county has other elected offices, including sheriff, coroner, auditor, treasurer, recorder, surveyor, and circuit court clerk. These officers are elected to four-year terms. Members elected to county government positions are required to declare party affiliations and to be residents of the county. The current Putnam County Jail was built in 1995 for $5.6 million.

Demographics

2010 census
As of the 2010 United States Census, there were 37,963 people, 12,917 households, and 9,256 families in the county. The racial makeup of the county was 93.4% white, 4.0% black or African American, 0.7% Asian, 0.3% American Indian, 0.5% from other races, and 1.1% from two or more races. Those of Hispanic or Latino origin made up 1.5% of the population. In terms of ancestry, 23.6% were German, 15.3% were American, 12.7% were Irish, and 12.6% were English.

Of the 12,917 households, 32.9% had children under the age of 18 living with them, 58.1% were married couples living together, 9.0% had a female householder with no husband present, 28.3% were non-families, and 23.9% of all households were made up of individuals. The average household size was 2.52 and the average family size was 2.96. The median age was 37.9 years.

The median income for a household in the county was $47,697 and the median income for a family was $59,354. Males had a median income of $44,615 versus $29,211 for females. The per capita income for the county was $20,441. About 7.7% of families and 10.3% of the population were below the poverty line, including 12.1% of those under age 18 and 7.7% of those age 65 or over.

Points of interest

Big Walnut Sports Park
Big Walnut Sports Park began as an all-volunteer effort in 1988. In May 2014, the nearly  park on Greencastle's far east side was deeded to the city of Greencastle. The park offers baseball, softball, and little league fields along with soccer fields, a walking trail, picnic tables, Frisbee golf, and a new dog park.

Cagles Mill Lake
In 1952, Cagles Mill Lake was built as Indiana's first flood−control reservoir, protecting the Eel and White river watersheds. Mill Creek feeds the  lake and is home to Cataract Falls. In the 1800s, the future Lieber State Recreation Area was populated by the Miami, Shawnee, and Potawatomi. In 1809, what was left of the great Miami Indian Confederacy sold the now southern one-third of Indiana to the US government, when the 10 O'Clock Treaty Line, which passes through Lieber SRA, was laid out.

DePauw University Nature Park
The DePauw Nature Park is a  moderately trafficked loop trail that features a lake, wildlife, and bird-watching. The trails are rated as moderate, offer a number of activity options and are accessible year round. Between 1917 and 1977, the site was a limestone quarry owned and operated by Hanson Aggregates. With the quarry dormant for decades, Hanson Aggregates donated  of the land and leased the remaining  to DePauw University for $1 per year for 99 years. DePauw commissioned Mansur Developers in 2002 to design a master plan for possible uses of the nature park. DePauw completed phase 1 of the master plan in 2004 and opened the Nature Park to the public in September 2004.

Fern Cliff
Fern Cliff and its sandstone cliffs have long been a popular Indiana refuge. Steep forested sandstone cliffs, lush wooded ravines, and a profusion of ferns and bryophytes characterize the preserve. The preserve is open for hiking, photography, and bird watching on its moderate to rugged terrain.

Glenn Flint Lake
Located in Putnam County north-northwest of Greencastle, the  Glenn Flint Lake is home to a relatively new population of game fish, including panfish. Lake renovation in 1995 removed large numbers of carp, so the bluegills and crappies are now doing well. The Little Walnut Creek Conservancy District owns the lake. The Indiana Department of Natural Resources Division of Fish and Wildlife (DFW) manages the fishery at Glenn Flint.

Greencastle People Pathways
People Pathways is a planning and implementation group established with the approval of the Greencastle Park Board of Commissioners. People Pathways has developed a multi-use recreation trail plan. The paths connect public spaces such as schools, parks, libraries, and community resources. Implementation of the People Pathways plan is being done in phases as opportunities develop.

Lincoln Park Speedway
Lincoln Park Speedway is located in Putnamville and features Nonwing Sprint Cars, UMP Modifieds, UMP Super Stocks, and Bombers at weekly racing events on Saturday nights.

Putnam Park Road Course

Putnam County Playhouse
The Putnam County Playhouse was organized in 1961 by Greencastle residents, "to provide the people of the county and the surrounding area with the opportunity to participate in and enjoy live theatre." For the first seasons, the plays and musicals were presented in various venues around the Greencastle. For the seasons of 1981 and 1982, plays and musicals were presented on an outdoor stage with bleacher seating. By 1983, the funds had been raised to convert a larger structure, a barn built in 1918, into an intimate 220-seat theater. The Hazel Day Longden Barn Theatre had its grand opening on June 4, 1983. Past performers presented a program of scenes and songs that had been produced by the PCP in its early years. In 1993, extensive work was done on the physical plant. A fly area was added and a new workshop and costume loft were constructed. The following year, a moderate cooling system was added and posts in the auditorium were removed. In April 2000, aluminum siding was added to the barn. Most recently, the seating system was completely replaced and the theater now has 198 seats.

The Putnam County Playhouse is active from June through September, presenting two musicals and two plays. Every other year, a children's workshop play is also produced.

Education
School districts include:
 Cloverdale Community Schools
 Greencastle Community School Corporation
 North Putnam Community Schools
 South Putnam Community Schools

Covered bridges

 The Dick Huffman or Webster Covered Bridge is the furthest south, just off I-70. This route is not at an interstate exit.
 Houck Covered Bridge is south of Greencastle. Oakala Covered Bridge is just a short distance away from Houk CB.
 Edna Collins Covered Bridge is considered to be haunted according to the Encyclopedia of Haunted Indiana.
 Dunbar Covered Bridge is the nearest to Greencastle and is accessed via US 231 north, under the concrete railroad viaduct.
 Baker's Camp Covered Bridge is east of Bainbridge on old US 36.
 Rolling Stone Covered Bridge is the next parallel north of US 36.
 Rolling Stone #2 is a third covered bridge is one parallel north of the Rolling Stone and is on gravel roads.
 Pine Bluff Covered Bridge is on a graveled road.
 Cornstalk Covered Bridge is the furthest north, east of Raccoon just off US 231. It is on a secondary road out of town to the south.

Athletics
Putnam County offers many athletics:
 Indiana Smoke Softball (Indiana Smoke is headquartered in Coatesville.
 Indiana Smoke Baseball
 Putnam County Swim Team (PSCT-IN, headquartered in Greencastle)
 Athletics at the Big Walnut Sports Park (in east Greencastle).

See also

 National Register of Historic Places listings in Putnam County, Indiana

References

Further reading
 Etcheson, Nicole. A Generation at War: The Civil War Era in a Northern Community (2011); scholarly study focused on Putnam County

 
Indiana counties
1821 establishments in Indiana
Populated places established in 1821